Cinema Peligrosa is the debut full-length studio album by the American post-punk band Glorium. It was released on Undone Records in 1994 on vinyl and compact disc. It was recorded at Sweatbox Studios in Austin, Texas, and produced by Tim Kerr.

Track listing
 "The Misinformed Vs. The Uniformed" – 4:21 
 "70 X 7" – 0:49 
 "The Final Dis" – 2:24
 "Death Of The Insect Queen" – 6:29 
 "Mutant Lover Special" – 4:10 
 "Victim" – 5:01
 "The Fossil" – 4:25
 "Having The Devil On Your Side" – 4:08
 "Under The Lid" – 3:56
 "Blue Lights Beckon" – 1:54
 "Possession Weapon" – 4:17
 "A Place To Crash" – 6:07
 "Cinema Plastique" – 5:33

Personnel
George Lara – bass
Juan Miguel Ramos – drums
Ernest Salaz – guitar, vocals
Lino Max – guitar, vocals
Paul Streckfus – vocals
Tim Kerr – producer
 Paul Stautinger, Ben Lutin – engineer
 Walter Daniels, harp on "Having the Devil On Your Side"

References

Glorium albums
1994 albums